Steve Robertson may refer to:

 Steve Robertson (actor), of Scotland the What? fame
 Steve Robertson (racing driver) (born 1964), English racing driver

See also
Stephen Robertson (disambiguation)
Steven Robertson (born 1970), Scottish actor